The Wilkes County Courthouse in Wilkesboro, North Carolina was designed by Wheeler, Runge & Dickey in Classical Revival and Beaux Arts style.  It was built in 1903.

It was listed on the National Register of Historic Places in 1979. It is located in the Downtown Wilkesboro Historic District.

Wilkes Heritage Museum
The Wilkes Heritage Museum is now housed in the historic courthouse. Opened in 2005, the museum's exhibits include early settlement, military history, industry, agriculture, medicine, communication, education, pottery, entertainment and transportation.  The museum also maintains and operates tours of the Old Wilkes County Jail (c. 1859) and the Robert Cleveland Log House (c. 1779), as well as the Blue Ridge Music Hall of Fame.  The museum also owns the Thomas B. Finley Law Office.

References

External links
 Wilkes Heritage Museum
 Video Overview

Courthouses on the National Register of Historic Places in North Carolina
Neoclassical architecture in North Carolina
Beaux-Arts architecture in North Carolina
Government buildings completed in 1903
Buildings and structures in Wilkes County, North Carolina
County courthouses in North Carolina
Museums in Wilkes County, North Carolina
National Register of Historic Places in Wilkes County, North Carolina
Historic district contributing properties in North Carolina
1903 establishments in North Carolina